Bruno Mráz (born 13 April 1993) is a Slovak ice hockey player. He is currently a free agent.

He previously played five games in the Kontinental Hockey League for HC Slovan Bratislava.

International
He participated at the 2010 and 2011 World Junior Ice Hockey Championship under 18 years and at 2012 World Junior Ice Hockey Championships under 20 years as a member of the Slovakia men's national junior ice hockey team.

Career statistics

Regular season and playoffs

International

References

External links

1993 births
Living people
Brandon Wheat Kings players
AZ Havířov players
MHC Martin players
HC Olomouc players
HK 36 Skalica players
Slovak ice hockey centres
HC Slovan Bratislava players
Ice hockey people from Bratislava
HKM Zvolen players
HC Košice players
HK Dukla Michalovce players
Slovak expatriate ice hockey players in Canada
Slovak expatriate ice hockey players in the Czech Republic